Supercard of Honor VII was the 7th Supercard of Honor professional wrestling internet pay-per-view (iPPV) event produced by Ring of Honor (ROH). It took place on April 5, 2013 at the Hammerstein Ballroom in New York, New York.

Storylines
Supercard of Honor VII featured professional wrestling matches, which involved different wrestlers from pre-existing scripted feuds, plots, and storylines that played out on ROH's television programs. Wrestlers portrayed villains or heroes as they followed a series of events that built tension and culminated in a wrestling match or series of matches.

Results

References

External links
ROHwrestling.com (official website)

Ring of Honor pay-per-view events
Events in New York City
2013 in New York City
ROH Supercard of Honor
Professional wrestling in New York City
April 2013 events in the United States
2013 Ring of Honor pay-per-view events